West Germany (performing as Germany) took part in the Eurovision Song Contest 1982, held in Harrogate, North Yorkshire, United Kingdom.

The German national final to select their entry, Ein Lied für Harrogate, was held on 20 March at the Bayerischer Rundfunk Studios in Munich, and was hosted by Carolin Reiber.

Twelve songs made it to the national final, which was broadcast by Bayerischer Rundfunk to ARD broadcasters across West Germany. The winner was decided by a sampling of 500 random West Germans who were meant to symbolize a fair representation of the country's population. Each person gave every song a vote, from 1 (for worst) to 12 (for best). Therefore, the theoretical "worst score" a song could receive would be 500, and the "best score" would be 6000. Three of the competitors previously represented other countries: French singer Séverine won the 1971 contest on behalf of Monaco, Paola previously represented her native Switzerland at two different contests (1969 and 1980), and Jürgen Marcus previously represented Luxembourg at the 1976 contest. Additionally, Mary Roos had represented Germany in 1972, and would return as the German representative two years later.

The winning entry was "Ein bißchen Frieden," performed by Nicole and composed by Ralph Siegel with lyrics by Bernd Meinunger.

Before Eurovision

Ein Lied für Harrogate

At Eurovision

Nicole was the eighteenth and final performer on the night of the Contest, following Ireland. At the close of the voting the song had received 161 points, placing first in a field of 18 competing countries. A 61-point gap was recorded between Nicole and the second-place finisher, Avi Toledano from Israel, setting a then record for the largest gap between first and second place. Only Luxembourg did not award Germany any points, awarding 12 points to host nation the United Kingdom who finished 7th.

Voting

Congratulations: 50 Years of the Eurovision Song Contest

"Ein bißchen Frieden" was one of fourteen Eurovision songs chosen by fans and the EBU to participate in Congratulations, the fiftieth-anniversary contest. It was the only German entry in the contest. Unlike the majority of other living entrants, Nicole was unable to attend, so the performance simply combined a dance troupe with footage of Nicole's 1982 performance. It was followed by a pre-taped greeting from Nicole. "Ein bißchen Frieden" was performed fifth, following "Eres tú" and preceding "Nel blu dipinto di blu." After the first round, "Ein bißchen Frieden" was not one of the five songs chosen to proceed to the next round. It was later revealed that the song finished seventh, with 106 points. Notably, in spite of it being a major international hit and their only winning entry at the time (they would later win again five years later with Lena's "Satellite" at the  contest), Germany only awarded "Ein bißchen Frieden" three points in the first round, with their twelve going instead to ABBA's "Waterloo." Their twelve points in the second round were awarded to "Nel blu dipinto di blu."

Voting

References

External links
German National Final 1982 - Geocities.com

1982
Countries in the Eurovision Song Contest 1982
Eurovision